Aco Stojkov (born 29 April 1983) is a Macedonian retired footballer who last played for Osogovo.

Club career
Previously he has played with national teammate Goran Pandev in F.C. Internazionale Milano Primavera, 2001/02, which won the youth league title. He was then loaned to lower-level teams in Italy to gain some experience but failed to impress Internazionale and his contract with them expired. Stojkov has since played in Poland, Belgium, Serbia, Hungary, and currently plays for Aarau in Switzerland. He joined FK Partizan in summer of 2006 and played with the club the first half of the 2006–07 season. Although he did not made any league appearance, he played one match in the Serbian Cup. He is renowned for his speed and dribbling abilities.

International career
He has represented his country on all youth levels before making his senior debut for Macedonia in an August 2002 friendly match against Malta in Skopje. He has earned a total of 42 caps, scoring 5 goals. His final international was a November 2014 European Championship qualification match against Slovakia.

International goals

Honours
Debreceni VSC
Nemzeti Bajnokság I: 2006–07
Hungarian Cup: 2007–08
Hungarian Super Cup: 2007
Rabotnicki
Macedonian First League: 2013–14
Macedonian Cup: 2013–14
Vardar
Macedonian First League: 2012–13, 2015–16, 2016–17
Macedonian Super Cup: 2013, 2015
Skënderbeu
Albanian Superliga: 2014–15
 Akademija Pandev
Macedonian Cup: 2019

References

External links
 Aco Stojkov at Football Federation of Macedonia official website
 Profile at MacedonianFootball.com 
 
 
 

1983 births
Living people
Sportspeople from Strumica
Association football forwards
Macedonian footballers
North Macedonia youth international footballers
North Macedonia under-21 international footballers
North Macedonia international footballers
FK Belasica players
Spezia Calcio players
Górnik Zabrze players
A.S.D. Castel di Sangro Calcio players
S.S. Fidelis Andria 1928 players
R.A.A. Louviéroise players
FK Partizan players
Debreceni VSC players
Nyíregyháza Spartacus FC players
FC Aarau players
Zob Ahan Esfahan F.C. players
FK Vardar players
FC Botoșani players
FK Rabotnički players
KF Skënderbeu Korçë players
Akademija Pandev players
FK Osogovo players
Macedonian First Football League players
Serie C players
Ekstraklasa players
Serie D players
Belgian Pro League players
Nemzeti Bajnokság I players
Swiss Super League players
Swiss Challenge League players
Persian Gulf Pro League players
Liga I players
Kategoria Superiore players
Macedonian Second Football League players
Macedonian expatriate footballers
Expatriate footballers in Italy
Macedonian expatriate sportspeople in Italy
Expatriate footballers in Poland
Macedonian expatriate sportspeople in Poland
Expatriate footballers in Belgium
Macedonian expatriate sportspeople in Belgium
Expatriate footballers in Serbia
Macedonian expatriate sportspeople in Serbia
Expatriate footballers in Hungary
Macedonian expatriate sportspeople in Hungary
Expatriate footballers in Switzerland
Macedonian expatriate sportspeople in Switzerland
Expatriate footballers in Iran
Macedonian expatriate sportspeople in Iran
Expatriate footballers in Romania
Macedonian expatriate sportspeople in Romania
Expatriate footballers in Albania
Macedonian expatriate sportspeople in Albania